Gümerdiğin is a quarter of the town Şabanözü, Şabanözü District, Çankırı Province, Turkey. Its population is 1,189 (2021). Before the 2013 reorganisation, it was a town (belde). Gümerdiğin is nearly 6 km northwest of Şabanözü and nearly 80 km from Ankara. Although Şabanözü is a district of Çankırı Province, Gümerdiğin is mostly in relation with Ankara.

Economy

Agriculture is the main part of the economy. There are two artificial lakes and also Sanı Çayı is used to supply water for the fields. Wheat, beans, apple and a bunch of vegetables are the main produce.

Education
In Gümerdiğin there's a primary and a middle school but not a high school. The students from some neighbouring villages also attend school here.

History
The town was named after Seljuk commander Humar Tigin who came to the area after the Battle of Manzikert with his clan. The name was slowly corrupted over time to its present form Gümerdiğin.

Health
In Gümerdiğin there's a state health office. In the office there a nurse, and a health officer but no doctor. When a doctor is needed people are transferred to Şabanözü where there's a State Hospital. Gümerdiğin is also lack of Pharmacy and the medicals can be obtained from Şabanözü also.

Demographics
Gümerdiğin's population is as follows;

Mayors of Gümerdiğin Municipality

References

External links
 Local information website 

Şabanözü